The Baton Rouge Ladies Invitational was a golf tournament on the LPGA Tour from 1964 to 1966. It was played at the Sherwood Forest Country Club in Baton Rouge, Louisiana.

Winners
Baton Rouge Ladies Invitational
1966 Carol Mann

Baton Rouge Invitational
1965 Mickey Wright

Baton Rouge Ladies' Open Invitational
1964 Sandra Haynie

References

Former LPGA Tour events
Golf in Louisiana
Sports competitions in Baton Rouge, Louisiana
Recurring sporting events established in 1964
Recurring sporting events disestablished in 1966
1964 establishments in Louisiana
1966 disestablishments in Louisiana
History of women in Louisiana